Pomaderris edgerleyi is a species of plant. The species was named after John Edgerley.

It is native to New Zealand.

References 

edgerleyi